Lü Shengzhong (born 1952) is a Chinese artist who specializes in the ancient Chinese art of paper cutting. He came of age during the turbulent Cultural Revolution. When China started to open up following the death of Chairman Mao in 1976, Lu Shengzhong turned to traditional Chinese folk arts, unlike his contemporaries who embraced contemporary art forms practiced in the West, such as installation art, oil paintings and performance art. "I walked away from the cultural confusion of the time and turned back to traditional folk art," he says. 

His hand cut red tissue-paper art works, with their bold, centered, mandala-like designs, resemble antique paper cuts, combined with calligraphic elements  with streams of hand-drawn elements skimming over the musings of sages.

Early life

Lü was born in the Dayuji village in Shandong, China, in 1952. Shandong has long been known for its paper cutting art culture.  Lu's father was a farmer where his mother was a house-wife, who was well known around the village for her paper cutting talents.  As a child, Lu fell in love with the way his mother would create art with cut scraps of paper.

As Lü got older, his fascination for paper cutting began to fade.  As a young adult he joined the army for a short while.  After the army, he worked for a short period of time as a film projectionist.  In the mid 1970s he attended art school at Shandong Normal University, and graduated in 1978 with a degree in Fine Arts.  After graduation he later attended Central Academy of Fine Arts (CAFA) in Beijing for his masters program in the early 1980s. During this time period, China's art scene began a change from socialist realist paintings.  His classmates began to discover rock & roll music, blue jeans, jazz, as well as the art genre of Dada.  Lu Shengzhong graduated from Central Academy of Fine Art in 1987, with a masters in folk art.

After earning his masters, Lu began to travel through China's hinterland.  One of his memorable trips was the northern Shaanxi province, a rough area that's known for its rough, arid terrain, as well as the poverty within the area.   Lu embraced the culture, by watching the local peasant women create memorable shapes and objects out of paper.  For example, they would cut out, frogs, mice pomegranates, lotus flowers, rabbits, etc.

Early career
In 1988, Lü had his very first exhibition at China's National Art Gallery.  He turned the art gallery into a "temple filled with totem-like images", by using cutouts of footprints that were suspended in mid air, as well as silhouette patterns accompanied by illegible calligraphy.  Lu's display at China's National Art Gallery caught the attention of local art critics, but Lu Shengzhong felt no sense of glory as he described his art as “a lonely struggle along a desolate path.”  Lu later wrote a more detailed description stating:

“Exerting the utmost strength I squeezed out of a marketplace filled with contentious crowd, and found a silent, forgotten little path to walk on.  Intrigued by unfamiliarity and longing, I followed it to retrieve original characteristics of humankind that have been filtered out by civilization, to summon images of lost souls in the polluted air, to understand the spiritual pursuit of mankind in its infancy, and to search for the deep connection linking my native land with the rest of the world.  All my efforts are to nourish the ancient culture.  Thus suddenly I gain confidence, because in my mind I have paved a path for today’s art.” (Lu Shengzhong: Book of Humanity: Empty Book 2005)

Within Lu Shengzhong's early career as an emerging artist, he has entered many solo and group exhibitions between the late 1980s and mid 1990s including:

 1989: Life-Ephemeral and Eternal, Taipei, Taiwan
 1989: China Avant-Garde, NAGC, Beijing
 1990: Calling the Soul Hall, Central Academy of Fine Arts Gallery, Beijing
 1990–1992: Calling the Soul Around, Beijing, Hebei, Shanxi, Hunan, Guanxi, and Liaoning provinces
 1991: Calling the Soul, Museum of Contemporary Art, Beijing
 1992: Red Train, Emden, Berin, Wiesbaden, and Hamburg, Germany
 1992: Begenung Mit Den Anderen, Halle K18, Gesanthochschole, Kassel, Germany
 1992-1993: Post-Mao Product, New Art from China, traveling exhibition in Australia
 1994: Asian Art Show, Fukuoka Art Museum, Japan
 1994: Soul Stele, Adelaide, Australia
 1994: Soul Market, Beck Forum, Munich, Germany
 1994: Emergency Center, St. Petersburg, Russia
 1995:  ORT -+, Wuppertal, Germany
 1995: International Biennial Art Show, Gwangju, Korea
 1995: 4th Asian Art Show (Realism as an Attitude), Setagaya Art Museum, Japan
 1996: ARCOS DA LAPA, Rio de Janeiro, Brazil
 1996: Origin and Myths of Fire, The Museum of Modern Art, Saitama, Japan
 1996: Calling the Soul, Fukuoka Art Museum, Japan
 1998: Notes Across Asia, Berlin, Germany
 1998: Recalling Tradition, German Embassy, Beijing
 2000: First Encounter, Chambers Fine Art, New York, USA
 2000: Record of Emotion, the Watchtower-Contemporary Art, Beijing
 2000: Gate of the Century (1979–1999) Chinese Art Invitational Exhibition, The Contemporary Art Museum, Chengdu
 2001: Lu Shengzhong: World!, Fukuoka Art Museum, Fukuoka, Japan
 2001: Beijing-Dachauer, Dachauer Schloss, Germany
 2001: Clues to the Future, Red Gate Gallery, Beijing, China
 2002 : A la nuit tombée: Lu Shengzhong, Grenoble, France
 2002 : De Waan Venray Asylum, the Netherlands
 2003 : Auspice From Above, Eslite Gallery, Taipei, Taiwan
 2003: Guangzhou Triennial, Guangzhou Museum of Fine Art, Guangzhou, China Blue Sky Exposure, Yizhuang, Beijing, China
 2003: Synthi-Scapes: Chinese Pavilion of the 50th Venice Biennale, (cancelled due to SARS), later shown in Guangzhou Museum of Fine Art, Guangzhou, China
 2003: Openness, China Art Museum, Beijing, China
 2003: Left Hand, Right Hand, 798 Art Space, Beijing, China
 2004: The Book of Humanity, Chambers Fine Art, New York, USA
 2004: Cinesi artisti fra tradizione e presente, Marsilio Art Museum, Italy
 2004: Universal Figure—A. R. Penck and Lu Shengzhong, White Space Gallery, Beijing, China
 2005: The New Emerging From the Old, University Art Museum, University at Albany, New York, USA
 2007: Square Earth, Round Heaven, Chambers Fine Art, New York, USA

Chinese Folk Artist
"I use paper to cut this little red figure to demonstrate the delicate fragility of human beings. Ephemeral. A human’s life is shorter than a paper’s thickness. The material is not important. What is more important is the process you use to create that material. This is more valuable to me."

Lu Shengzhong is a Chinese artist at the China Central Academy of Fine Art in Beijing, who specializes in the ancient Chinese paper cutting.

His most well-known craftsmanship is called “Little Red Figures”, in reality, it is an old and famous procedure in China, named paper-cutting, which is utilized widely in the society specialty of china. The figure, which looks similar to a small kid, is an exceptionally regular element in Chinese time honored paper cutting, the nearby folks think this small squirt can evacuate the adversities so they continue cutting paper of small tyke, but it is unequivocally shown in the farmland far at a distance from the urban. This is a symbolization and universal society disregarded by virtuoso extended time, but Lu identify it and reproduces it, made it as a formal craftsmanship and considerable throughout giving the philosophical and customary nature.

"For my project, there are two inspirations, the one is I think I really need to express something about culture in my design, try to find the culture meanings from Chinese folk art, actually, it is not hard, because Chinese folk art related with culture very close. The other thing is I should think about how to make my artwork more related with people’s daily life, I should try to makes it looks like a thing in nowadays."

Cutting to the Spirit
Lu Shengzhong is a Chinese artist and he went to UAlbany on October, creating and installing a powerful new piece composed of red paper dolls. The cutting of Little Red Figures is ritual and performance in its pure sense, practiced for generations as a devotional act to bring fertility to the family and as a symbol of ancestral continuity.

A celebration environment suffuses the twofold-stature studio. Red vibrations fill one's eyes and revive the faculties. A couple red cut-paper shades falling from the top side and cadenced swirls and rehashed plans in red, white and dark wrapping around the upper display dividers try to fill your fringe vision. Being a spot overpowered is an essential for a heavenly reaction, and this is feasibly an impact on Shengzhong. A combo of dread and interest frequently fabricated by reiteration and scale regularly are hung out with the eminent. They set up an environment of secret and open the brain to non rational methodologies. Since you've ever been in a Chinese temple you realize what I mean. The immeasurable space of the University Symbolization Exhibition hall works both for and in opposition to this impact. The scale allows an introduction of fabulous proportions, but the partitioning of units that might have reinforced one another make a less burnable air.

The sublime is not ordinarily hung out with hilariousness or modesty, but the apprehension that the swarming red vigor is made out of amusing small folks, some with ponytails, some with the oversize head of an infant child, fetus or frog, carries a grin to one's confront. Prolongation and fertility of both society and race is the subject, and it is treated with a gentility of spirit.

The ground surface-to-roof piece The Unfilled Book—The Book of Mankind that Shengzhong finished at UAlbany contains several books at top side tallness, holding 900 pages that have been sliced to free and suspend portions of textless paper. Every coterminous line from every page joins similar to an umbilical line to small red individuals that splay out in the deck. This piece strongly sets aside doctrine and confirms the imperativeness of the individuals, and is the standout of the show.

The demonstration of cutting is moreover vital as an image of the Dao, the standard that grips positive and negative drives. Shengzhong's piece The Vertical of Negative and the Level of Negative, a 42-foot-extended cut-paper painting, encapsulates this guideline. Expansive, huge-headed children make islands around which masses of humbler figures swarm like schools of fish or sperm, raising momentums that convey the eye. Shapes in dark and red transform from figure to ground and to figure again in a euphoric showcase of formal stroke of genius.

In the four boards from the piece The Poetry of Congruity, Shengzhong likens allegorical recombination with the inference of dialect, a letter set of structure. He astutely makes mandalas from symmetrically put cut deciphers, and lays lines of shapes vertically or evenly beneath, made from snippets of broken set patterns. From a separation these pieces give off an impression of being conventional calligraphy parchments, but it is clear Shengzhong has an impulse regarding comicality that is a bit subversive.

Close viewing is constantly remunerated. Subversive humor was a survival tactic that Shengzhong utilized in making suggestive subtexts covered up in the enchanting worker accounts of Adoration Tune, time honored compositions on silk. Alternate early plans showed on the ground stun of the display have a non specific, stylized hand that, however useful, will usually draw vigor at a distance from the surface explanation made by the in statement.

Three Elements
Lu bases the theme of his paper cutting around the dynamic life cycle of paper cutting. The theme is an old technique that sustains vitality through infinite recreation and variation. With the art of recreation and variation as a basic technique, the art itself becomes a way becomes the art of constant renewal, not only in the art but life as well.  For instance the art was used in holidays, festivals, weddings, and funerals.  These events mark certain passages within a person's life. There are three basic elements in Lu Shengzhong's artwork that he finds essential in the art of paper cutting.

The first element is the dynamic relationship between positive and negative forms, in which is constantly created in the art of paper cutting.  Lu feels what's so significant to this is the fact one cannot us positive or negative forms alone, but for them to be used together, as in a single piece of paper that creates a conceptual whole.

The second element is referred to as the materiality of paper cutting.  First and foremost, the art of paper cutting always generates tension between two- dimensionality and three dimensionality, for the fact that a piece of paper is assumed to be two-dimensional for being such a flat surface.  Regardless of the way paper is cut, it still has a volume, as well as a front and back.  When Lu creates a piece, and attaches the paper cuts to aboard, he compares his work to a painting and a sculpture, he then begins to contest the relationship between the two art forms.  Lu also feels that a paper cut also represents fragility, for the fact that paper is vulnerable to natural and human disasters.  Fragility has been the theme and subject matter used in Lu Shengzhong's artworks.

The third element in Lu Shengzhong's work is the temporal, meditative nature of paper cutting.  This refers back to when he had the conversation with a local peasant woman while visiting the Shaanxi province.  Lu asked of her the thought process of the paper cuts she was creating, and she replied “nothing, there is nothing in my mind.”  To interpret the answer, Lu begins to approach his paper cutting with creative processes, emotion, and rational thinking, at the same time makes doesn't make him creative.  What makes Lu Shengzhong, and the peasant woman so significant, is the fact that when they create a piece, they are expressing as well as releasing themselves with abstract visual forms.

Publication
1990: Works of Shenzhong, Lu, Hunan Art Publication Press
1992: Folk Paper-cut, Hunan Art Publication Press
1992: Huazhou Shadow Figures, Hunan Art Publication Press
1994: Chinese Folk Wood Engraving, Hunan Art Publication Press
1994: Selection of Line Drawing of Lu Shengzhong, Guangxi Fine Arts Publication House Press
1995: Seeking the Soul, Hunan Art Publication Press
1996: The Classic Appreciation of Folk Paper-cut, China Films Press
1998: Lu Shengzhong: Calling the Soul, Guangxi Fine Arts Publication House Press
2000: Drafting Characters, China Youth Publication Press
2000: The First Meet, New York Chambers Fine Art Press
2001: Walking and Observing, SDX San Lian Bookstore Publishing
2001: Flourmade tiger of Langzhuang (collaborate with Li, Hongjun), Taiwan Echo Publishing Press
2002: Colored Clothes, Guangxi Fine Arts Publication House Press
2002: Baby's Gallus, Guangxi Fine Arts Publication House Press
2003: Original Manuscript of Molding, SDX San Lian Bookstore Publishing
2003: Farewell Tradition I, SDX San Lian Bookstore Publishing
2003: Farewell Tradition II, SDX San Lian Bookstore Publishing
2003: The Arrival of Luck, Taiwan Eslite Gallery Press
2003: The Story of Little Red Kid, Shanghai Literature and Art Publishing Press
2004: Farewell Tradition III, SDX San Lian Bookstore Publishing
2004: Farewell Tradition IV, SDX San Lian Bookstore Publishing

Stamps Design
1988: Countryside Culture (4 pieces of memorial), China Post　　
1988: Chinese Agricultural Sports Conference (2 pieces of memorial), China Post
1989: She Han Ling Zhi,  Safety with all Seasons (stamp with the animal of Chinese Birth year), China Post
1996: Xi Jian Guang Ming,  The Myriad of Lights (stamp with the animal of Chinese Birth year 2 pieces of memorial), China Post
2005: Rooster Crows (stamp with the animal of Chinese Birth year), China Post
2006: Guo Tai Min An (stamp with the animal of Chinese Birth year), China Post

Later career
Lu published a book in 2005 entitled The Book of Humanities, where he discusses as well as displays his past and present works.  The book also employs Lu's three elements behind paper cutting along with his philosophy towards his artwork in several volumes.  Some of the books collage pages were scraps from actual pieces that Lu Shengzhong created.  The collages in the book are of little red figures such as frog, paper people, and other various shapes.

Lu Shengzhong currently works as a professor at the very school where he earned his master's degree, Central Academy of Fine Art, in the department of Research Institute for Folk Art Studies in Beijing.  Lu teaches up to eight classes per semester, and is very enthusiastic and well involved with his students, in hopes that they will be the future for art

References

 https://web.archive.org/web/20090502194042/http://www.chambersfineart.com/en/contemp/lshen-bio.html
 http://findarticles.com/p/articles/mi_m1248/is_6_93/ai_n13804286/
 https://web.archive.org/web/20110724083739/http://www2.thorn.net/~alexa/clips/lsz.html
 Newell, L.B. (2007). Out of The Ordinary.  South Kensington, London, England: V&A Publications
 https://archive.today/20130126004940/http://www.htsdart.com/html/artist/detail_2012_01/08/141_3.shtml
 http://www.vam.ac.uk/vastatic/microsites/1637_outoftheordinary/artists_biography.php?artistTag=shengzhong

Artists from Shandong
Living people
1952 births
People from Dezhou
Chinese contemporary artists